Śliwice may refer to the following places in Poland:
Śliwice, Lower Silesian Voivodeship (south-west Poland)
Śliwice, Kuyavian-Pomeranian Voivodeship (north-central Poland)
Śliwice, Opole Voivodeship (south-west Poland)
Śliwice, Warmian-Masurian Voivodeship (north Poland)